Stefano Barberi (born March 27, 1984) is a Brazilian/American professional mountain bike and gravel racer, and former professional road bicycle racer. He resides in Reno, Nevada with his wife Katie Barberi and son Micheli Barberi. He was born in São Paulo.

Major results
2005
 6th Overall Tour of Puerto Rico
2008
 3rd Overall Tour of Pennsylvania
2015
 1st Stage 2 Nature Valley Grand Prix

External links
 Road-results.com profile
 USA Cycling profile

References

1984 births
Brazilian male cyclists
Brazilian road racing cyclists
Brazilian mountain bikers
Living people
Sportspeople from São Paulo